Nada Kamel (born 27 August 1990 in Cairo, Egypt) is an Egyptian archer. She competed in the individual event at the 2012 Summer Olympics.

References 

Egyptian female archers
1990 births
Living people
Sportspeople from Cairo
Archers at the 2012 Summer Olympics
Olympic archers of Egypt
21st-century Egyptian women